The Brothers Hospitallers of Saint John of God, officially the Hospitaller Order of the Brothers of Saint John of God (abbreviated as O.H.), are a Catholic religious order founded in 1572. In Italian they are also known commonly as the Fatebenefratelli, meaning "Do-Good Brothers", and elsewhere as the "Brothers of Mercy", the "Merciful Brothers" and the "John of God Brothers". The order carries out a wide range of health and social service activities in 389 centres and services in 46 countries.

Founder
St John of God, the founder of the order, was born 8 March 1495 at Montemor-o-Novo in Portugal. Twice he enlisted in the Spanish army against the French and later the Turks. After years of living a highly religious way of life in Spain resulting from a conversion experience, in 1535 he founded his first hospital at Granada, where he served the sick and afflicted. After ten years spent in the exercise of charity, he died 8 March 1550 of pneumonia after he had plunged into a river to save a young man from drowning. He was canonized by Pope Alexander VIII in 1690 and was declared the patron saint of the dying and of all hospitals by Pope Leo XIII in 1898.

History 
John of God's first companion, Anton Martín, O.H., was chosen to succeed him as prior general of the order. Thanks to the generosity of King Philip II of Spain, a hospital was founded at Madrid, another at Córdoba and several others in various Spanish towns. Pope Pius V approved the Order of the Brothers Hospitallers in 1572 under the Rule of St. Augustine. The order spread rapidly into the other countries of Europe, and even into the distant colonies. For example, the Order provided staff to the Fortress of Louisbourg in New France (now Canada) during the mid 1700s; one of their roles was the operation of the hospital. 

In 1584, Pope Gregory XIII called some of the Brothers to Rome and gave them the Hospital of St. John Calybita, Fatebenefratelli Hospital, located on an island in the Tiber, which then became the motherhouse of the whole order. Brother Sebastiano Arias founded the Hospital of Our Lady at Naples and the famous Hospital of Milan. Another Brother Hospitaller at this time was John Grande, O.H., who was beatified by Pope Pius IX in 1852. The first general of Brothers Hospitallers of St. John of God was Pedro Soriano.

Expansion

The membership of the Order consists of over 1,250 Brothers who come from 50 countries. The coworkers who partner the Brothers in their activities number approximately 40,000. The Order has bases in over 40 countries.

The first hospital of the order in France was founded in Paris, in 1601, by Queen Marie de Medici. In the stormy days of the French Revolution the Brothers were expelled from the forty hospitals where they were caring for 4,125 patients. New large hospitals were subsequently established, after the revolution's end.

The Order was brought to Poland in 1609. The rich Krakowian merchant Valerian Montelupi (of Italian heritage) donated to the brothers a tenement house not far from the main square. In the 1800s they were relocated to Kazimierz, the then-separate city, now district of Kraków, where to this day, they reside in their monastery and church, running their large hospital next door, in Trinitarska street.

In 1880 a house was founded at Scorton, North Yorkshire, England, for the reception of male patients with chronic infirmities, paralysis, or old age, and is supported by charitable contributions. The original foundation developed into a hospital and nursing home. In 1930 the Brothers started a work in Potters Bar caring for people with learning disabilities. In the early days, the St John of God Hospital had its own farm of about five acres of land which supported cows, pigs and poultry, along with a couple of horses. In addition, a hospice of the order has been established at Nazareth.

In 1882, a home for men with dementia syndromes was founded at Stillorgan near Dublin, Ireland. Activities in the Irish Republic include a base in Celbridge, County Kildare, Ireland, helping people with disabilities in the area. The Irish postal authority, recognised and honoured the contribution of the order to society by issuing a special commemorative postage stamp in 1979 for the order's centenary in Ireland.

The Hospitaller Brothers were established in the United States in 1941, where they operate health care facilities in southern California offering a continuum of care including: Independent Living, Assisted Living, Skilled Nursing, Residential Care, Retirement Living and a specialized Alzheimer Unit. A large school and training center was established by Brothers from the Irish Province in New Jersey to meet the needs of the mentally and physically disabled.

In December 1947, Australia's Cardinal Gilroy announced two Brothers from the Order had arrived from Ireland, and a further four Brothers would arrive in January 1948 to establish the St John of God Training Centre for "sub-normal boys" on a 50-acre property near Lake Macquarie (New South Wales). Cardinal Gilroy noted "All six Brothers are certificated mental nurses, each holding RMN and RMPA certificates". The site was later named Kendall Grange.

In 2017, the report of a Royal Commission into Institutional Responses to Child Sexual Abuse established in Australia claimed that over 40% of the Brothers of the Australian Order of St John of God were alleged child sex abusers.

The Order also has many health projects in African countries, such as Malawi, Ghana, Kenya and Sierra Leone. The Brothers operate the Saint-Jean de Dieu Hospital in Tanguiéta, in northern Benin. When first built it had sixty beds. Now it is a reference point for the entire region and has 290 beds, serving people from neighbouring countries such as Burkina Faso, Togo, Nigeria, and Niger.

Ebola outbreak
The outbreak of the Ebola virus in West Africa in 2014 had a major impact on the medical centers run by the Hospitaller Brothers in that region. As of September, sixteen members of the staff at St. Joseph Hospital in Monrovia, Liberia, and St. John of God Hospital in Lunsar, Sierra Leone, died. Of these, three were members of the Order who served at the hospital in Liberia. The first two to die were Patrick Nshamdze, O.H., a native of Cameroon and the director of the hospital, and George Combey, O.H. A third member, Miguel Parajes, O.H., a priest from Spain, contracted the disease while caring for Nshamdze, who had not tested positive for the disease initially. He was airlifted at his request by the Spanish government for treatment in his native country. He later died, becoming the first victim of the disease to die in Europe.

Also returned to Spain with Parajes was Sister Juliana Bonoha Bohé, M.I.C., a native of the former Spanish colony of Equatorial Guinea, one of a group of Missionary Sisters of the Immaculate Conception who worked with the Brothers at the hospital. Once in Spain, she tested negative for the virus. Spain, however, refused to transport her colleague, Sister Chantal Pascaline Muwamemem, M.I.C., from the Congo, who later also died of the disease.

In September, a fourth Hospitaller Brother, Manuel García Viejo, a native of Spain and the medical director of the Brothers' hospital in Sierra Leone, was nursing Brother Patrick Nshamdze, before he had tested positive for Ebola. He himself later fell ill. Initially he wished to remain but he eventually asked to be repatriated to Spain. He too died several days after his arrival in a hospital in Madrid at the age of 69.

Order of the Brothers Hospitallers

Charism
The charism of the order is caring for the sick, as a way of living the beatitudes of Christ.

Apostolate
A particular apostolate of the order is the Special Needs Faith Formation Program, which serves children and adults with special needs in preparing to receive the sacraments within the Roman Catholic Church.

The Brothers undergo a special course of training in order to fit them for carrying out their various works of charity to which they devote their life. In some provinces some of them are even graduates in medicine, surgery and chemistry. The members are not in holy orders, but priests wishing to devote their sacred ministry to the Brothers and patients are received. To the three solemn vows of religion they add a fourth vow of serving the sick for life in their hospitals.

They assist daily at Mass, meditation, the recital in choir of the office of Our Lady and spiritual reading. The order accepts applications from men between the ages of fifteen and thirty-five. The religious habit is usually given to postulants after three months. The time of novitiate is two years, after which the novice pronounces the vows which, although simple, are perpetual. Three years later, he can be admitted to solemn profession.

Structure 
As of 2014, the Brothers are split into 20 Provinces: Africa, Andalusia, Aragon, Austria, Bavaria, Castille, Colombia, France, India, Korea, Lombardy–Veneto, Northern South America, Oceania, Poland, Portugal, Rome, Southern South America, United States of America, Vietnam and West Europe. There exists one Vice-Province: Benin–Togo, and two General Delegations: Canada and Mexico & Central America. There are seven Provincial Delegations: Brazil, dependent on Portugal, Bohemia–Moravia, Hungary and Slovakia, all three dependent on Austria, Japan, dependent on Korea, Papua New Guinea, dependent on Oceania, and Philippines, dependent on the Roman Province.

Sexual abuse scandals
In 2013, the Victorian Parliamentary Inquiry (VPI) looked at the order's operations in Victoria, Australia. The current head of the order, Brother Timothy Graham, confirmed to the VPI that sixteen brothers had allegations of sexual abuse made against them and were the subject of two civil actions. The first was relating to the abuse of adults at the Order's Lilydale facility. There were also 20 child-related complaints. In 2014, seven of the brothers accused remained in the order, nine had left, and the remainder were deceased.

Graham told the VPI his order had no scrutiny or accountability mechanisms in place to prevent the abuse of the vulnerable children in their care. Brother Brian O'Donnell, former provincial of the order in Australia said that, "In my experience, no allegations of sexual misconduct against the brothers was ever documented and would be currently held in the archives ... this practice was followed in order to deal with the situation in its actual context without compromising the good name of the (brother) involved." Graham confirmed that despite 40% of the brothers in his order having serious allegations of sexual abuse levelled against them, no checks and balances were in place to vet prospective new members.

The Royal Commission into Institutional Responses to Child Sexual Abuse looked at some case studies pertaining to the order but was unable to fully investigate due to the trials of Bernard McGrath and John Clegg.

In 2020, the second episode of the ABC documentary series Revelation followed the criminal trial of McGrath at the New South Wales District Court. Presenter Sarah Ferguson interviewed McGrath in his maximum security prison, where McGrath revealed that he was part of an institutional cover-up, with former leaders Brother Brian O'Donnell and Brother Joseph Smith aware of his offending. McGrath also told Ferguson that following complaints from his victims, Smith had taken him to meet Father Brian Lucas, the priest responsible of the Australian Catholic Church's response to the child sexual abuse scandal. This meeting took place in 1992 at the presbytery of St Mary's Cathedral, Sydney. Shortly afterwards, Smith accompanied McGrath to a treatment facility in Jemez Springs, New Mexico, United States. During McGrath's stay at Jemez Springs, Smith was formally notified of a police investigation and called McGrath, telling him he should stay in the United States. McGrath decided to return to Australia and was arrested and convicted of sex crimes against Jason Van Dyke.

New Zealand

The order ran the Maryland's School which taught pupils with learning difficulties, in Christchurch, New Zealand. Events there in the 1970s would later lead to a high-profile scandal with sexual offence charges being laid against four members of the order: Brothers Bernard McGrath, Roger Maloney, Raymond Garchow, and William Lebler.

In 2020, it was announced that the Hospitaller Brothers of St John of God would be specifically investigated by the Royal Commission of Inquiry into Abuse in Care and its sub-inquiry into care by the Catholic Church in New Zealand. The royal commission undertook to investigate the sexual abuse of children under the care of the Brothers of St John of God in Marylands, their residential school in Christchurch. Public hearings into Marylands School abuse were held by the Commission during 9–17 February 2022. The Commission plans to hold public hearings into two further St John of God, Christchurch institutions: St Joseph's Orphanage and the Hebron Trust.

Australia
The Royal Commission into Institutional Responses to Child Sexual Abuse uncovered that 40% of the members of the order had child abuse allegations against them between 1950 and 2010.

New South Wales 
Kendall Grange, Morisset

Kendall Grange, a residential facility for boys was established in 1947 by the Bishop of Newcastle at Morisset, New South Wales. The bishop invited brothers of the Hospitaller Order of St John of God to teach boys aged predominantly between 8 and 15 who had behavioural, emotional and intellectual problems.

Kendall Grange was run with the assistance of civilian staff. Around 300 boys lived at the school at any one time housed in dormitories and rooms on the school grounds. Boys were grouped together according to their age. House-mothers assisted looking after the boys.

In 2010, New South Wales Police commenced investigating allegations made against brothers and civilian teachers associated with the school. As a result, Brother Bernard McGrath and Brother John Clegg were convicted of multiple counts of sexual offences committed upon students at Kendall Grange.

The following St John of God brothers taught at Kendall Grange:

The other brothers who allegedly committed offences are deceased or were deemed unfit to stand trial.

Bernard McGrath faced his fifth criminal trial in Sydney in 2019. The trial was featured in ABC's documentary series Revelation. Presenter Sarah Ferguson interviewed McGrath in a maximum security prison, where McGrath admitted the Order covered-up his sexual abuse.

Victoria 
Churinga, Cheltenham and Lilydale
In 2012, Wayne Chamley of the advocacy group Broken Rites alleged that a group of 15 religious brothers from the Order of St John of God abused children in their care over three decades, including wards of the state, in homes for the mentally impaired.

The allegations related to the order's institutions at Churinga, Cheltenham, and Lilydale, Victoria, where it provided accommodation and education for orphans, state wards, and boys with intellectual disabilities from the 1950s to the 1980s.

In 2001, members of the order, their lawyers, their insurers, and victims held a meeting in response to legal claims by dozens of former residents of the order's homes. Peter Gordon and barrister John Gordon represented the victims. The allegations included:

 One brother, Daniel Slattery, was the subject of seven or eight abuse allegations starting in 1975 but was never reported to the police. Brother Daniel assaulted one boy, the abuse was covered up and then two years later, Daniel abused the same boy again.
 Complaints were ignored or shifted from institution to institution. 
 Parents wrote letters complaining of abuse but were ignored.

The claims led to a Victoria Police investigation and in 2002, the order paid at least $3.6 million to 24 men who alleged they had been abused by the brothers.

Brother Roger Melville Mount
Despite the compensation, a number of the alleged offenders, including Brother Roger 'Gabriel' Mount, were allowed to move to other roles. In late 2012, journalist Rory Callinan tracked down Brother Roger 'Gabriel' Mount to a small community east of Port Moresby, Papua New Guinea, where he was living illegally.

Mount joined the Order of St John of God in 1961 and adopted the religious name Gabriel. During his time in the Order, he worked at Yarra View during 1968–1969 and Churinga until 1974. He was then transferred to Port Moresby and became the superior of the Order's community in Papua New Guinea. Mount was contracted to the government, working with the Office of the Director of Child Welfare in Boroko. He left the Order in 1981 and became a priest.

Mount was accused of abusing children when he was working as Brother Gabriel with the Order of St John of God at Kendall Grange, NSW and at boys homes in Victoria. It was also revealed the Order of St John of God had paid more than $100,000 to his victims.

In early 2014, Father Ben Fleming, a Port Morseby diocesan official, said the church would act to move Mount. Mount ignored their requests to leave his parish and attempted to overdose. Following his discharge, PNG immigration officials deported Mount to Cairns on 15 October 2015.

Victorian Police detectives from Taskforce SANO were granted permission to extradite Mount from Queensland to Victoria. On 16 January 2015, Mount appeared in Melbourne Magistrates' Court via video link from Port Philip prison. Mount was charged with 40 counts of indecent assault, 14 counts of buggery, five counts of gross indecency and three counts of unlawful assault involving seven victims between 1968 and 1974.

On 14 December 2015, a jury found Mount (73) guilty of three charges of indecent assault, three charges of buggery of a person under 14 years old and two charges of buggery in relation to victim SL. Judge Hannan sentenced Mount to seven years and 10 months imprisonment and required him to sign the sex offenders registry.

Membership statistics 
In the following table, 'SP' will stand for 'solemnly professed', which refers to members having taken permanent vows. 'TP' will stand for 'temporary professed', which refers to members having taken temporary vows. 'N' will stand for 'novices,' which refers to members who have recently joined the order and are not under vows. Oblates, or laypersons affiliated with the order and its way of life but not living under professed vows, are not included in the table.

See also
 Vatican Pharmacy
 2014 Ebola virus epidemic in Liberia
 Revelation TV Series

Notes

References

External links

 Hospitaller Order of Saint John of God
 Australia
 Australia and New Zealand
 International
 Sierra Leone
 The Netherlands
 Ireland

 
1572 establishments in Spain
Religious organizations established in the 1570s
Catholic religious orders established in the 16th century